Riceville is an unincorporated community and census-designated place (CDP) in Cascade County, Montana, United States. It is in the southeastern part of the county, along U.S. Route 89 in the valley of Belt Creek, at the northern edge of the Little Belt Mountains.

Riceville was first listed as a CDP prior to the 2020 census.

Demographics

References 

Census-designated places in Cascade County, Montana
Census-designated places in Montana